The 2018–19 Washington Huskies men's basketball team represented the University of Washington in the 2018–19 NCAA Division I men's basketball season. The Huskies, led by second-year head coach Mike Hopkins, played their home games at Alaska Airlines Arena at Hec Edmundson Pavilion in Seattle, Washington as members of the Pac-12 Conference. They finished the season 27–9, 15–3 in Pac-12 play to win the regular season championship. They advanced to the championship game of the Pac-12 tournament where they lost to Oregon. They received an at-large bid to the NCAA tournament where, as a No. 9 seed, they defeated No. 8 seed Utah State in the First Round before losing to No. 1 seed North Carolina in the second round.

Previous season
The Huskies finished the 2017–18 season 21–13, 10–8 in Pac-12 play to finish in a tie for sixth place. They lost to Oregon State in the first round of the Pac-12 tournament. They received an invitation to the National Invitation Tournament where they defeated Boise State in the first round before losing to Saint Mary's in the second round.

Off-season

Departures

Incoming transfers

2018 recruiting class

Roster

Schedule and results

|-
!colspan=12 style=| Exhibition

|-
!colspan=12 style=|Non-conference regular season

|-
!colspan=12 style=| Pac-12 regular season

|-

|-

|-

|-

|-

|-

|-

|-

|-

|-

|-

|-

|-

|-

|-

|-

|-

|-
!colspan=12 style=| Pac-12 Tournament

|-

|-

|-
!colspan=12 style=| NCAA tournament

Rankings

*AP does not release post-NCAA Tournament rankings^Coaches did not release a Week 2 poll.

Awards and honors

Pac-12 Player of the Week

All Pac-12 Team

 First team: Jaylen Nowell & Matisse Thybulle
 Honorable mention: Noah Dickerson

Pac-12 All-Defensive Team

 Matisse Thybulle

Pac-12 Player of the Year
 Jaylen Nowell

Pac-12 Defensive Player of the Year
 Matisse Thybulle

Pac-12 John R. Wooden Coach of the Year
 Mike Hopkins

References

Washington Huskies men's basketball seasons
Washington
Washington Huskies basketball, men
Washington Huskies basketball, men
Washington